The Rinckel Mansion is a historic house in Carson City, Nevada, United States, that is listed on the National Register of Historic Places (NRHP).

Description
The house is located at 102 North Curry Street and was built in 1872. It was home of Mathias Rinckel, a merchant in Carson City. It was designed and built by Ecole de Beaux Arts-trained architect Charles H. Jones. It was deemed significant for its association with Rinckel and "because it is one of the finest and best-preserved examples of French Victorian architecture remaining in the American West."

It was listed on the NRHP November 20, 1975. The building has been owned by the Nevada Press Foundation since 2000 and houses the offices of the Nevada Press Association.

See also

 National Register of Historic Places listings in Carson City, Nevada
 Lauritz H. and Emma Smith House, Draper, Utah, another NRHP-listed work of Charles H. Jones

References

External links

 

Victorian architecture in Nevada
Houses completed in 1875
Historic American Buildings Survey in Nevada
National Register of Historic Places in Carson City, Nevada
Houses on the National Register of Historic Places in Nevada
Houses in Carson City, Nevada